The Predator is a 2018 American science fiction action film directed and co-written by Shane Black and Fred Dekker. It is the fourth installment in the Predator franchise. Black had a supporting role in the original film, while John Davis returns as producer from the first three installments. Starring Boyd Holbrook, Trevante Rhodes, Jacob Tremblay, Keegan-Michael Key, Olivia Munn, Thomas Jane, Alfie Allen, and Sterling K. Brown, it follows a group of PTSD-afflicted soldiers and a scientist who must team up to fight off an invading pair of Predators and discover their plans for mankind.

Talks of a new Predator installment began in June 2014, with Black being confirmed as writer and director; much of the cast signed on between October 2016 and January 2017. Filming took place in British Columbia from February to June 2017, with the climax being re-written and re-shot in July 2018 following poor test screenings.

The Predator premiered at the Toronto International Film Festival on September 6, 2018, and was theatrically released in the United States on September 14, 2018, by 20th Century Fox, in IMAX and Dolby Cinema, as well as standard formats. The film grossed over $160.5 million worldwide and received mixed reviews by both critics and audiences. A prequel, titled Prey, was released on Hulu in 2022.

Plot

A Predator ship crash-lands on Earth. U.S. Army Ranger sniper Quinn McKenna and his team are attacked by the Predator while on a hostage retrieval mission. McKenna incapacitates the Predator and has parts of its armor sent off by mail to prove the existence of extraterrestrial life. Government agent Will Traeger has McKenna captured and held for examination. Traeger also takes the Predator to a lab for experimentation and observation, recruiting evolutionary biologist Casey Bracket to study it, who discovers that the Predator's genetic makeup contains human DNA. The Predator awakens, breaks out of its restraints, and kills the lab workers and armed guards, but spares Bracket, the only unarmed person, before escaping.

McKenna is bussed off with a group of other government captives, including former Marines "Nebraska" Williams, Coyle, Baxley, Lynch, and Army helicopter pilot Nettles. Witnessing the Predator's escape from the lab, they hijack the bus. Taking Bracket with them, they head over to McKenna's estranged wife, Emily, where he expects to find the Predator armor he mailed off. However, Rory, McKenna's autistic son, has gone trick-or-treating in the armor in hopes of avoiding detection from bullies.

McKenna and the others find his son in time to stop a pair of Predator Hounds from ambushing the boy. McKenna blows one up by shooting a grenade into its mouth; Nebraska unintentionally lobotomizes the other dog after shooting it in the head. The Predator chases them into a nearby school and they start to give the Predator's armor back when a larger, more powerful Predator arrives and engages the first in combat. The group flees, and the second Predator kills the first before setting out to retrieve the lost technology.

Bracket concludes that the Predators are attempting to improve themselves with the DNA of humans and, presumably, other planets' inhabitants. She mentions that the larger Predator generates an exoskeleton that renders him resistant to damage, even from weapons of Predator technology. The team flees to an abandoned barn, but Traeger finds and captures them, and shares his theory that the Predators anticipate that climate change will end their ability to retrieve human DNA for further hybridization, and as such are scrambling to retrieve samples before it is too late. Seeing Rory drawing a map to the spaceship, Traeger takes the boy to the ship. The team escapes and goes after him with the help of the now docile, brain-damaged Predator hound.

Once all have arrived at the crashed ship, the second Predator arrives, kills Lynch, and explains through translation software that it will destroy the ship to keep it out of their hands and then give them all a head start before it hunts them down. The Predator quickly kills several of Traeger's soldiers while mortally wounding Baxley and Coyle, who then euthanize each other. Traeger tries to use a Predator weapon on the alien but accidentally kills himself instead.

The Predator takes Rory, recognizing his autism as an advancement in human evolution which makes him a worthwhile subject for hybridization, and flies away in his ship. McKenna, Nebraska, and Nettles land on the ship's exterior, but the Predator activates a force field that slices off Nettles' legs, and he falls off the ship to his death. Nebraska sacrifices himself and slides into the ship's turbine, causing it to crash. McKenna sneaks into the ship as it crashes and attacks the Predator. After the crash, Bracket arrives, and the three manage to overpower and kill the Predator with its weapons. They pay their respects to their fallen comrades with trinkets representing each one before heading off.

Later, McKenna and Rory are seen in a science lab watching the opening of cargo found on the Predator's ship, which a scientist indicates was left behind intentionally. A piece of technology floats out and attaches itself to a lab worker, working as a transformative "Predator killer" suit before deactivating. Realizing the first Predator was trying to pass it on to humanity for a fair fight against the larger Predators, McKenna indicates he will be the pilot to operate the suit.

Cast

 Boyd Holbrook as Quinn McKenna, Emily's estranged husband, the father of Rory and an Army Ranger Captain who discovers the existence of the Predators and leads the battle against them. 
 Trevante Rhodes as Nebraska Williams, a former Marine officer who joins in a special Predator-hunting operation headed up by Quinn and becomes his closest ally.
 Jacob Tremblay as Rory McKenna, Quinn and Emily's son, who has a form of autism and is bullied in school, but becomes a key player in the fight against the Predators due to his preternatural ability to learn languages.
 Keegan-Michael Key as Coyle, a Marine veteran, who teams up with Quinn and Williams to fight the Predators.
 Olivia Munn as Casey Brackett, an evolutionary biologist who joins the crew's mission.
 Sterling K. Brown as Will Traeger, a government agent and Director of the "Stargazer Project" who jails Quinn, but later needs his help with fighting the Predators.
 Thomas Jane as Baxley, a Marine veteran from the Afghanistan and Iraq wars whose Tourette syndrome causes tics and involuntarily swearing (see Tourette syndrome in film). His character was named after Craig R. Baxley, the stunt coordinator of the 1987 film.
 Alfie Allen as Lynch, a former Marine who teams with several other outsiders, including Quinn, to stop the human-hunting Predators in suburbia.
 Augusto Aguilera as 'Nettles', a former Huey helicopter pilot and religious zealot who has suffered a traumatic brain injury from a crash.
 Jake Busey as Sean Keyes, a head Stargazer scientist, the son of Peter Keyes (played by Busey's father Gary Busey in Predator 2).
 Yvonne Strahovski as Emily McKenna, Quinn's estranged wife and the mother to Rory.

Other cast members in smaller roles include R. J. Fetherstonhaugh as Agent Thomas J. Church, Peter Shinkoda as Dr. Yamada, Lochlyn Munro as Lieutenant General Marks, Nikolas Dukic as Derek, Gabriel LaBelle as E.J., Niall Matter as Sapir, Mike Dopud as Dupree, and Garry Chalk as Postal Worker. The Predators were portrayed in-suit and via motion capture by stuntmen Brian A. Prince and Kyle Strauts, with vocal work by Brian A. Prince. Françoise Yip briefly appears as Ms. Cullen Yutani, an operative of "Project Stargazer", reprising her role from Aliens vs. Predator: Requiem, although her speaking scenes were cut. Stuntwoman Breanna Watkins, in scenes that were filmed but not used, portrayed Ellen Ripley in one alternate ending, and an adult Rebecca "Newt" Jorden in a second alternate ending, meant to tie in to the Alien franchise in which those characters first appeared and set up an Alien vs. Predator-focused sequel film, depicted as having travelled back in time as the "Predator Killer". Edward James Olmos had a supporting role as General Woodhurst, but his scenes were cut due to time constraints.

Production

Pre-production
In June 2014, Fox announced a sequel. Shane Black, who also starred as supporting character Rick Hawkins in Predator, directed, and co-wrote with Fred Dekker, while John Davis produced. Davis has said of the film that he thinks it is fresh and reimagines the franchise in a "different, interesting way". In February 2016, Black stated that the title of the new sequel would be The Predator. He has referred to the project as an event film which aims to elevate the Predator series: "It's an attempt to 'event-ise' the Predator again... [An attempt to] make it more mysterious." Black also expressed that the film would mark a return to the "intimate" scale of the original film and that the filmmakers hoped to achieve “the same sense of wonderment and newness that Close Encounters had when that came out.”

The film is set in the present day and the titular character has upgraded armor. Black has said that he looked for plot details set up in the previous Predator movies that he could retrospectively link back to with the new film. To that end, Jake Busey was cast as Sean Keyes, the son of Peter Keyes (a character who was portrayed by Busey's father Gary Busey in Predator 2). In February 2016, the studio revealed a teaser image of the film, confirming the title The Predator.

Chief-executive-officer of 20th Century Fox Stacey Snider shared her thoughts on The Predator and Shane Black and Fred Dekker's script:

Casting
Arnold Schwarzenegger talked with Black about reprising his role as Dutch Schaefer from the first Predator film, but declined the cameo due to the short role. Rapper 50 Cent also spoke of the possibility of being involved in the film but ended up dropping out. By September 2016, Benicio del Toro had signed on to star. The following month, Boyd Holbrook replaced del Toro, who departed due to scheduling issues. In November 2016, Olivia Munn joined the cast. In January 2017, Trevante Rhodes, Keegan-Michael Key, Sterling K. Brown, Thomas Jane and Jacob Tremblay joined the cast. In February, Alfie Allen and Yvonne Strahovski were added. In March, the last main role was filled by Augusto Aguilera while Jake Busey was also cast in a supporting role.

In March 2017, Edward James Olmos was cast as Sanchez, a military general. In August 2018, Olmos announced that his role had been cut from the final film, to reduce the film's running time, as his character was not integral to the plot.

Filming
Filming was scheduled to begin in February 2017 in Vancouver, British Columbia. On November 21, 2016, Larry Fong was confirmed hired as cinematographer for the film. Black announced that filming had begun on February 20, 2017. Additional photography in Vancouver took place in March 2018.

Post-production
The visual effects were provided by MPC, Atomic Fiction, Raynault VFX, Rising Sun Pictures and Proof.

Music

Henry Jackman provided the musical score for the film, which incorporates Alan Silvestri's themes from the 1987 film. The film's soundtrack album was released by Lakeshore Records on September 28, 2018.

Release

Theatrical
The Predator was originally scheduled by 20th Century Fox for a March 2, 2018, release date, until the date was moved to February 9, 2018. It was then delayed to August 3, 2018. In February 2018, the released date was delayed to September 14, 2018. The film's release included IMAX theaters. On May 10, 2018, the first trailer was released. A television spot was released on June 9, while a second full trailer was released on June 26, 2018. The third and final theatrical trailer was released on August 31, 2018, featuring the song "One Shot, One Kill" by Jon Connor featuring Snoop Dogg. The film's world premiere was at the Toronto International Film Festival on September 6, 2018, at the Ryerson Theatre. The film was later released in the US on September 14, 2018.

Home media
The Predator was released on DVD, Blu-ray and 4K Ultra HD formats on December 18, 2018, in America, alongside short film The Predator Holiday Special, in which Santa Claus and his elves and reindeer encounters a Predator at the North Pole. The film would eventually be released on DVD, Blu-ray and 4K Ultra HD formats on December 18, 2018, in the United Kingdom.

The film's third act was originally set during the day; after the resulting sequences were deemed ineffective, they were largely reshot at night. Black wanted the home media release to include both versions of the film, Predator AM and Predator PM, but the studio declined, not wanting to pay to complete the daylight version's digital effects.

Reception

Box office
The Predator grossed $51 million in the United States and Canada, and $109.5 million in other territories, for a total worldwide gross of $160.5 million, against a production budget of $88 million. It ranked the fourth-highest-grossing film behind Predators, the original Predator and Alien vs. Predator, at the domestic box office.

In the United States and Canada, The Predator was released alongside White Boy Rick, A Simple Favor and Unbroken: Path to Redemption, and was projected to gross $25–32 million from 4,037 theaters in its opening weekend. It made $10.5 million on its first day, including $2.5 million from Thursday night previews. It went on to debut to $24 million, finishing first at the box office but marking a lower start than the 2010 film ($24.8 million). It dropped 65% in its second weekend to $8.7 million, finishing fourth. In its third weekend the film grossed $3.9 million, finishing eighth.

Critical response
The website's critical consensus reads, "The Predator has violence and quips to spare, but its chaotically hollow action adds up to another missed opportunity for a franchise increasingly defined by disappointment." On Metacritic, the film has a weighted average score of 48 out of 100 based on 49 critics, indicating "mixed or average reviews". Audiences polled by CinemaScore gave the film an average grade of "C+" on an A+ to F scale, those on PostTrak gave it a 66% positive score and a 55% "definite recommend", and social media monitor RelishMix noted there were "mixed reactions" about the film online.

Writing for The Hollywood Reporter, Jordan Mintzer called the film "bigger, meaner, gorier, funnier" than previous installments, writing, "Whether the world actually needs [a sequel], and whether this reboot was necessary at all, is probably a question worth raising, but at least Black's take on it is to never take it too seriously while keeping us duly entertained." Brian Tallerico of RogerEbert.com praised the ensemble, pacing and Black's direction, writing, "Black is assisted greatly by an incredibly charismatic cast, and he knows how to use them to amplify their strengths." A. A. Dowd of The A.V. Club wrote "The Predator, which Black penned with Monster Squad co-writer and director Fred Dekker, makes a few concessions to modern blockbuster filmmaking, including an overabundance of CGI, a blatantly franchise-thirsty ending, and some winking references to the original. But the movie's values are more 1988 than 2018, and that's what makes it fun, at least in spurts: Black has captured the spirit of that bygone era of adrenaline-junkie junk without getting all retro-fussy about it." He graded the film a B−.

In a negative review, Dennis Harvey of Variety called it "an exhaustingly energetic mess in which a coherent plot and credible characters aren't even on the cluttered menu." Writing for Nerdist, Katie Walsh called the film "messy, chaotic, and convoluted", adding that its "comedy and action are at war with each other. Characters spew rat-a-tat quips, while tussling with Predators and their pets, essentially neutralizing the effect of both the humor and the action." Jonathan Barkan, writing for Dread Central, gave the film two out of five stars, saying, "Poor story choices and strange, if not outright silly, character decisions result in an experience that will ultimately leave audiences feeling a great amount of 'meh'." Jim Vejvoda of IGN gave the film a 6.5 out of 10, saying, "The Predator does a lot right to reinvigorate the 31-year-old series. But everything crashes down during its frenzied, messy final act, a disappointing conclusion to what had largely been a fun romp up until that point."

Later Boyd Holbrook looks back on the underperformance of The Predator and what he learned from the experience: “I just think the first one [Predator] caught lightning in a bottle,” Holbrook admits. “And with people wanting to do more, maybe you should just let a sleeping dog lie, sometimes.”

Director Shane Black later blamed himself for the film's failure: “I’m not going to take the road of blaming anyone – including the studio – for a failed movie. We tried something different. In retrospect – talking of finger on the pulse – I guess we just didn’t have that finger.”

Controversies
Director Shane Black hired his longtime friend Steven Wilder Striegel (known professionally as "Steve Wilder") for a minor, un-auditioned role in The Predator, in which his character repeatedly tries to flirt with Bracket, played by Olivia Munn. Wilder has been a registered felony sex offender since 2010, when he pleaded guilty to "enticing a minor by computer" after he attempted to lure a 14-year-old girl into a sexual relationship via email. A few days before picture lock on the film, Munn became aware of Wilder's history and approached Fox executives, insisting that the scene be removed.

Black defended his casting decision and his friend, until later issuing a public apology and rescinding those comments during backlash. Fox released a statement saying that they were unaware of Wilder's status and confirming that the scene had been cut from the film. Co-star Sterling K. Brown tweeted in support of Munn, but initially, most other actors on the film remained silent, releasing statements after mounting public pressure.

The Predator also suggests not only that autistic persons who exhibit savant qualities and other forms of neurodiversity are or were advantageous, but that they represent a forward step on the human evolutionary path. According to the scientific opinions reported by Syfy Wire, such a thesis would have some issues. A New York Post review ends by stating: "But worse is a plot line involving autism and a dubious scientific theory that will leave parents fuming." In a review for Uproxx, Emma Stefansky called the film's depiction of autism, "maybe the worst thing I have seen in a film this year" and scolds the filmmakers for their depiction of these issues, especially the idea that "autism = really smart".

Other media

Books
The Predator received a novelization co-written by Christopher Golden and Mark Morris, with the audiobook narrated by James Patrick Cronin. It also received a prequel novel titled The Predator: Hunters and Hunted written by James A. Moore, the audiobook also narrated by Cronin.

Possible sequels
John Davis said that The Predator would set up two sequels that he hoped Shane Black would return to direct. Concerning this, Black stated that "I would love to say we've been planning a trilogy, but I take one day at a time, in motion-picture terms that's one movie at a time." With the sale of 21st Century Fox's assets, including 20th Century Fox studios, to The Walt Disney Company the future of the series was called into question, though Bob Iger confirmed that certain properties would remain R-rated.

Prequel

In December 2019, Dan Trachtenberg was announced to be developing a film under the working title of Skulls, with a script from Patrick Aison, set during the American Civil War and following "a Comanche woman who goes against gender norms and traditions to become a warrior". In November 2020, it was revealed that the project would actually be a fifth film in the Predator franchise. Trachtenberg indicated that he had been working on the film since 2016, while the original intention was to market the project without any references to Predator. The Walt Disney Company produced the project through their 20th Century Studios banner.

In May 2021, Amber Midthunder was cast in the lead role of Naru in the film, officially titled Prey, which began filming in June. Prey premiered at the San Diego Comic-Con on July 21, 2022.

See also
 List of monster movies

References

External links
 
 
 
 
 
 

2018 films
2018 science fiction action films
2010s adventure films
2010s monster movies
2010s science fiction horror films
2010s science fiction comedy films
2010s comedy horror films
American monster movies
American science fiction action films
American science fiction adventure films
American science fiction comedy films
American sequel films
Davis Entertainment films
Films about autism
Casting controversies in film
Halloween horror films
Films directed by Shane Black
Films produced by John Davis
Films scored by Henry Jackman
Films set in 2018
Films set in Georgia (U.S. state)
Films set in Johns Hopkins University
Films set in Los Angeles
Films set in Mexico
Films set in New Mexico
Films set in Tennessee
Films shot in Vancouver
Predator (franchise) films
Films with screenplays by Shane Black
20th Century Fox films
Films about extraterrestrial life
2018 comedy films
TSG Entertainment films
2010s English-language films
2010s American films